Standings and results for Group 6 of the UEFA Euro 2000 qualifying tournament.

Standings

Matches

Goalscorers

References

Group 6
1998–99 in Spanish football
qual
1998–99 in Israeli football
1999–2000 in Israeli football
1999–2000 in Austrian football
1998–99 in Austrian football
1999–2000 in San Marino football
1998–99 in San Marino football
1998–99 in Cypriot football
1999–2000 in Cypriot football